Icilio Guareschi (24 December 1847 – 20 June 1918) was an Italian chemist.

Icilio Guareschi studied at the University of Bologna and received his Ph.D there in 1871. He became professor at the University of Siena and in 1879 at the University of Turin, where he worked until his death in 1918.

Guareschi worked in the field of organic chemistry, pharmacy, toxicology and the history and chemistry. In 1894 he discovered a reaction to synthesise 2-Pyridones, today known as the Guareschi-Thorpe condensation.

References

  ICILIO GUARESCHI

1847 births
1918 deaths
People from the Province of Parma
Italian chemists
University of Bologna alumni
Academic staff of the University of Siena
Academic staff of the University of Turin